Chelsey Marie Reist (born January 4, 1987) is a Canadian actress, television host, and dancer. From 2014 to 2018 she played Harper McIntyre in The CW's sci-fi television series The 100. She starred as Rachel in the 2012 horror film No Tell Motel which screened at the Cannes Film Festival and she appeared in 12 Rounds: Reloaded starring WWE wrestler Randy Orton. In 2013, she appeared in the remake of the 1995 horror film Embrace of the Vampire starring Sharon Hinnendael. Reist also hosted the Canadian television series Discovering Great Towns.

Filmography

Film

Television

References

External links

1987 births
Living people
Actresses from Edmonton
Canadian film actresses
Canadian television actresses